Máximo González was the defending champion, but chose not to defend his title.

Gastão Elias won the title after defeating Horacio Zeballos 7–6(7–0), 6–2 in the final.

Seeds

Draw

Finals

Top half

Bottom half

References
 Main Draw
 Qualifying Draw

XIV Venice Challenge Save Cup - Singles
2016 Singles